Symphysodon discus, the red discus or Heckel discus, is a species of cichlid native to the Amazon Basin, where found in the lower Rio Negro, upper Uatumã, Nhamundá, Trombetas and Abacaxis.

This species grows to a length of  SL.

This species can also be found in the aquarium trade.

Parental care
Small fry of this fish feed on the mucus secreted by their parents.

References

External links

Cichlid fish of South America
Fish described in 1840
Mucous feeding fish
discus